Alope is a genus of shrimp in the family Hippolytidae, comprising two species:

Alope orientalis is widely distributed across the Indo-West Pacific.
Alope spinifrons is endemic to New Zealand, and is found throughout that country's coasts.

References

Hippolytidae
Decapod genera